In Greek mythology, Evadne (Ancient Greek: Εὐάδνη) was a name attributed to the following individuals:

Evadne, a daughter of Strymon and Neaera, wife of Argus (king of Argos), mother of Ecbasus, Peiras, Epidaurus and Criasus.
Evadne, a daughter of Poseidon and Pitane who was raised by Aepytus of Arcadia. She experienced the joys of her first love with Apollo. However, when her consequent pregnancy was discovered by Aepytus, he was furious and left to consult the Oracle of Apollo. During the childbirth, Apollo sent Eileithyia and the Moirae to assist his lover and ease her pain. Evadne gave birth in the wilderness and left the child, Iamus, exposed to the elements. Five days later, Aepytus returned from the Delphi, where he had been told by Apollo's Oracle that Evadne's child was indeed the son of Apollo and destined to be a gifted prophet. He demanded that the child be brought to him, and so Evadne retrieved Iamus from the patch of violets where she had left him. Iamus had been nurtured for those five days by the honeybees that were sent by Apollo, or by the Fates. Evadne named the child Iamus (“Boy of the Violets”). He went on to found the Iamidae, a family of priests from Olympia.
Evadne, a daughter of Pelias, King of Iolcus. She was given by Jason in marriage to Canes, son of Cephalus and a king of Phocis.
Evadne, daughter of Iphis of Argos or Phylax (or Phylacus) and wife of Capaneus, with whom she gave birth to Sthenelus. Her husband was killed by a lightning bolt in the war of the Seven against Thebes, and she threw herself on his funeral pyre and died. In some accounts, she was called the daughter of Ares.
Evadne, possible wife of Lycorus, by whom she became the mother of Hyamus, father of Apollo's consort, Celaeno.

In popular culture
Evadne is a character in The Maid's Tragedy, a play by Francis Beaumont and John Fletcher
 Evadne (play), an 1819 play by Richard Lalor Sheil
 In the 1970s Wonder Woman television series, Wonder Woman was shown to have had a cousin named Evadne played by actress Dorrie Thomson who competed in the contest for the title to become Wonder Woman
Dr Evadne Hinge was half of the musical duo Hinge and Bracket
Female main character in Rebecca West's short story "Indissoluble Matrimony"
 Evadne is a character in Mary Shelley's The Last Man
 Evadne Clapham is a minor character in Anthony Powell's A Dance to the Music of Time
 Evadne is a character in The Heavenly Twins by Sarah Grand
 Evadne is the narrator of a poem by the same name by American poet H.D.

Notes

References 

 Apollodorus, The Library with an English Translation by Sir James George Frazer, F.B.A., F.R.S. in 2 Volumes, Cambridge, MA, Harvard University Press; London, William Heinemann Ltd. 1921. ISBN 0-674-99135-4. Online version at the Perseus Digital Library. Greek text available from the same website.
Diodorus Siculus, The Library of History translated by Charles Henry Oldfather. Twelve volumes. Loeb Classical Library. Cambridge, Massachusetts: Harvard University Press; London: William Heinemann, Ltd. 1989. Vol. 3. Books 4.59–8. Online version at Bill Thayer's Web Site
 Diodorus Siculus, Bibliotheca Historica. Vol 1-2. Immanel Bekker. Ludwig Dindorf. Friedrich Vogel. in aedibus B. G. Teubneri. Leipzig. 1888–1890. Greek text available at the Perseus Digital Library.
 Euripides, The Complete Greek Drama edited by Whitney J. Oates and Eugene O'Neill Jr. in two volumes. 1. The Suppliants, translated by E. P. Coleridge. New York. Random House. 1938. Online version at the Perseus Digital Library.
 Euripides, Euripidis Fabulae. vol. 2. Gilbert Murray. Oxford. Clarendon Press, Oxford. 1913. Greek text available at the Perseus Digital Library.
 Gaius Julius Hyginus, Fabulae from The Myths of Hyginus translated and edited by Mary Grant. University of Kansas Publications in Humanistic Studies. Online version at the Topos Text Project.
 Pausanias, Description of Greece with an English Translation by W.H.S. Jones, Litt.D., and H.A. Ormerod, M.A., in 4 Volumes. Cambridge, MA, Harvard University Press; London, William Heinemann Ltd. 1918. Online version at the Perseus Digital Library
 Pausanias, Graeciae Descriptio. 3 vols. Leipzig, Teubner. 1903.  Greek text available at the Perseus Digital Library.
 Pindar, Odes translated by Diane Arnson Svarlien. 1990. Online version at the Perseus Digital Library.
 Pindar, The Odes of Pindar including the Principal Fragments with an Introduction and an English Translation by Sir John Sandys, Litt.D., FBA. Cambridge, MA., Harvard University Press; London, William Heinemann Ltd. 1937. Greek text available at the Perseus Digital Library.
 Publius Vergilius Maro, Aeneid. Theodore C. Williams. trans. Boston. Houghton Mifflin Co. 1910. Online version at the Perseus Digital Library.
 Publius Vergilius Maro, Bucolics, Aeneid, and Georgics. J. B. Greenough. Boston. Ginn & Co. 1900. Latin text available at the Perseus Digital Library.

Princesses in Greek mythology
Queens in Greek mythology
Children of Ares
Children of Poseidon
Children of Potamoi
Women of Apollo
Women of Heracles
Characters in Book VI of the Aeneid
Argive characters in Greek mythology
Characters from Iolcus
Phocian characters in Greek mythology
Thessalian characters in Greek mythology
Mythology of Argolis
Mythology of Phocis
Thessalian mythology
Suicides in Greek mythology
Greek feminine given names